Sui Lu (born 1 April 1992) is a retired Chinese gymnast. She started competing at the senior international level in 2008, and won a silver medal at the 2012 Olympics. Her strongest events were the balance beam, where she was the 2011 World Champion and 2012 Olympic Silver Medalist, and the floor exercise, where she won two World Championship medals.

Gymnastics career

Early career 
Sui Lu started training gymnastics at the age of 3, and was selected into the Shanghai team in 2000. In Chinese national level competition, Sui has made many achievements for the Shanghai team. She obtained team gold at the 2007 national championships, and gold for balance beam and floor exercise in the 2008 national championships, beating her national teammates and later Olympic champions Cheng Fei, Jiang Yuyuan, Li Shanshan and Deng Linlin.

Being a beam and floor specialist, Sui was one of the hopefuls to be selected to the Beijing Olympic team, which would later win China's first women's team gold medal. However, her inconsistent performances at the World Cup series in 2008 prevented her from making the final squad.

2009 
At the 11th Chinese national games in 2009, Sui led the Shanghai team as their key gymnast. She competed and successfully executed on all 4 apparatus in the team final. Her final spectacular floor performance allowed the trailing Shanghai team to upset the Guangdong team by 0.125 points and take the gold. She also achieved bronze in the all-around, gold on floor and bronze on balance beam, receiving a total of four medals at the 11th national games.

Since 2009, Sui has established herself as a strong Chinese beam and floor specialist and won many national and international titles.

Sui debuted at the senior international level at the 2009 World Championships in London. Here she received a bronze on floor exercise. She also placed 8th on balance beam after a fall in qualifications, but could not participate in the final as teammates Deng Linlin and Yang Yilin qualified ahead of her, and only 2 competitors per nation are allowed in finals.

In 2009, Sui Lu also won medals in a number of World Cups, including gold for floor at the Cottbus World Cup, gold for beam and floor at the Osijek World Cup, and gold for floor at the Stuttgart World Cup.

2010 
At the 2010 World Championships, Sui won a bronze medal with team China and finished 5th in the floor exercise final. She failed to make the beam final after a fall in the preliminary stage.

At the 2010 Asian Games in Guangzhou, Sui won a total of 4 gold medals (in team, all-around, beam and floor), more than any other gymnast and athlete at these games.

2011 
At the 2011 World Championships, Sui contributed in the team final on beam and floor, helping the team earn a bronze medal. Sui won the gold on balance beam after a performance that left her with a margin of more than 0.5 points over the silver medalist, teammate Yao Jinnan. Sui scored 15.866 during the final, which became the highest scoring beam routine in the entire London Olympic period (2009-2012). She immediately followed it with a strong performance in the floor final, winning the silver medal with a score of 15.066, behind Russian gymnast Ksenia Afanasyeva.

2012 
Sui revealed in a subsequent interview that she considered retiring after being left off the Olympics Team in 2008, but that these 4 years of hard work had been worth it, and that she was glad she persisted after encouragement from her coaches.

Sui was named to the Chinese women's artistic gymnastics team for the 2012 Olympic Games, where she helped her team to a fourth-place finish in the team final, contributing the highest scores for her team on beam (15.366) and floor (14.6). She additionally qualified in first place to the balance beam event final (15.4), where she finished with the silver medal (15.5) behind gold medalist and teammate Deng Linlin.

Retirement 
Sui Lu retired from gymnastics after the 2013 National Games. As of January 2022, she is working as a physical education teacher in Shanghai.

Competitive history

References

External links
 
 
 

1992 births
Living people
Chinese female artistic gymnasts
Medalists at the World Artistic Gymnastics Championships
Gymnasts at the 2012 Summer Olympics
Olympic gymnasts of China
People from Zhuzhou
Olympic silver medalists for China
Olympic medalists in gymnastics
Gymnasts from Hunan
Medalists at the 2012 Summer Olympics
Asian Games medalists in gymnastics
Gymnasts at the 2010 Asian Games
Asian Games gold medalists for China
Medalists at the 2010 Asian Games
World champion gymnasts